Christman Genipperteinga ( – 17 June 1581) was a German serial killer and bandit of the 16th century. He reportedly murdered 964 individuals starting in his youth over a 13-year period, from 1569 until his capture in 1581. Records of Christman Genipperteinga's life survive from a book printed 1581 or shortly thereafter; in 1587 a condensed account was included in a collection of calendar histories. An even more condensed Czech translation of that account appeared in 1590. A French translation was published in 1598, illustrated with a woodcut exhibiting the various details of the tale.

Similar tales circulated about robbers with names such as Lippold, Danniel, Görtemicheel, Schwarze Friedrich, Henning, Klemens, Vieting and Papedöne. The tale of Papedöne is particularly relevant, since a version of that story is contained in a book published in 1578, three years before Genipperteinga's alleged death.

Origins 
Christman Genipperteinga came from Körpen (Kerpen), a town two German miles away from Cölln (Cologne). He was born before 1569.

Lair 
For about seven years Christman lived in a cave complex about one German mile (just over 7.5 km) away from Bergkessel (alludes to Bergkastel, elder German for Bernkastel) in a wooded upland/mountain area called Fraßberg. From there, he had a good view over the roads going to and from Trier, Metz, Dietenhoffen (elder German for Thionville) and the Lützelburg land (elder German for Luxembourg).

The cave complex is described as being cleverly built, just like an ordinary house inside, with cellars, rooms and chambers, with all the household goods that ought to belong in a house.

Criminal activity and methods 
Historian Joy Wiltenburg identifies two important, occasionally overlapping, patterns of crime reports relative to serial killers in Early Modern Germany:

 Reports on robber-killers

Genipperteinga fits pattern 1, hoarding his ill-gotten gains in his cave. As Wiltenburg further remarks, however:

Furthermore, in contrast with the reports of other robber killers from that time, like those of Peter Nyersch and Jacob Sumer, depictions of supernatural abilities and/or contracts with the devil are absent from the 1581 account of Christman. He is also definitely reported as guilty of multiple infanticides, but the account from 1581 does not connect this with practice of black magic or cannibalism.

Christman preyed upon both German and French travelers. It was said that only a party of 3, 4, or even 5 travellers might be safe from him. Nor was he averse to double-crossing his own partners in crime in order to get his hands on the whole booty, rather than his "just share". Once they had helped bring the loot to his cave, he served them poisoned food or drink, with rarely anyone surviving beyond five hours. He is said to have thrown their bodies into a mine shaft connected with his cave complex.

Sex slave 
Shortly after he took up residence at Fraßberg, Christman met an intended victim, the young daughter of a cooper in Popert (Boppard) on the Rhine river. She was traveling to Trier to live with her brother. He ordered her under death threats to come and live with him. He made her swear she would never betray him, and for the next seven years, she served his sexual wants. Whenever he went out to find new victims, he bound her ankle with a chain so that she could not escape. He fathered six children with her but at birth he killed them, pressing in their necks (original: "hat er den Kindern das Genick eingedrückt").

Christman used to hang up their bodies, and stretched them out (orig: "aufgehängt und ausgedehnt"). As the wind made the little corpses move, he said:

Downfall 
Christman finally relented to the woman's repeated pleadings that she might be allowed to meet other people, and granted her expressed wish to visit Bergkessel under condition of a renewed oath not to betray him. But once there, seeing the little children running about in the streets, she had a breakdown, and went down on her knees in lamentation:

And she began to wail and weep bitterly. Many commiserated with her, but when anyone asked her about what her troubles were, she refused to reveal them. Brought before the mayor, she was urged to tell her story, and assured by learned men, by reference to Scripture, that if it was a matter of life and the soul, then she ought to confess. She then confessed everything she knew. In order to catch Christman off guard, the following scheme was hatched:
She was given a sack of peas, and with these, she marked the way to the cave complex.

On 27 May 1581, 30 armed men set out to capture him. He was asleep when they came, because she had made him relax with gentle words while she deloused his hair. As the armed men barged in, Christman cried out: "Oh, you faithless betrayer and whore, had I known this, I would have strangled you long ago".

Within Christman's cave complex, an immense amount of booty was found, in the form of wine, dried and/or salted meat, suits of armour, firearms and other weaponry, trade goods, coin and other valuables. The value was estimated as exceeding 70,000 Gulden. The author of the 1581 account notes that one might well have made a fair out of the booty found in Christman's cave.

Confession, trial and execution 

Christman kept a diary in which he detailed the murders of 964 individuals, as well as a tally of the loot gained from them. The diary was found among his possessions. In addition to this evidence Christman readily admitted to the murders, adding that if he had reached his goal of a thousand victims, he would have been satisfied with that number.

On 17 June 1581 Christman Genipperteinga was found guilty, and was condemned to death by the breaking wheel. He endured nine days on the wheel prior to expiring, kept alive in his sufferings with strong drink every day, so that his heart would be strengthened.

At the time of the pamphlet's end of writing, the loot from Christman's cave as well as the woman he had enslaved were kept at a certain location, the fates of both undecided.

Depiction 

The primary source regarding Christman Genipperteinga is a handful of pamphlets published in or shortly after 1581, Erschröckliche newe Zeytung Von einem Mörder Christman genandt ("Terrible new tidings about a murderer named Christman"). The alleged publisher of the pamphlet, Caspar Herber, is credited on the title page to come from Lochem on the Moselle river (alluding to the city of Cochem). No other publications of Caspar Herber survive. The various pamphlets are strictly parallel in wording, none has a printer or printing place, and they all claim on the title pages to be reprints of a print of an unnamed printer in Mainz of 1581 (or 1582 in one issue). They slightly differ in typesetting and typeface, some having ornaments or illustrations on the title page, and are the works of different printing offices, reprinting the story. The names of the towns (even the incorrect ones of Bergkessel and Lochem) are repeated in the different prints. Minor differences are: the title page of some issues date the trial to June 17, 1581, one reprint to October 17, 1581 instead, or, in some issues the maid went to live with her brother, in one reprint with her brothers. One of the issues has ornaments identical to the 1581 Feyerabend print of Frankfurt am Main of the Papedöne robber tale.

The story is reported in the form of a letter written from an unnamed person in Bergkessel to a likewise unnamed person in another town immediately after the events. Bergkessel is referred to as "our city" ("unsere Stadt") in the text. Fraßberg is an unknown location and appears in similar form in the Papedöne robber tale.

The tale was reprinted in full, with some editing and modernizing of language, by the antiquarian Johann Scheible in 1847. It was not used by local historians of Bernkastel or nearby Trier and has not been found recorded in archives.

Literary and social context 
The historian Joy Wiltenburg, in Crime and Culture in Early Modern Germany (2012) performed a close study of the popular crime reports from the sixteenth and seventeenth centuries. Her primary aims are to investigate where and how such works were produced, who had authored them, who read and collected such reports, and what particular crimes were principal concerns in these works, and how such questions may have had different answers for different times. Only tangentially does she seek to probe the authenticity of the individual conserved crime reports, that is, resolving the problem of how the discourse of crime accurately, or inaccurately, portrayed actual crime on the local scale.
As noted by her, concerning Early Modern Germany, it was in the 1570s that reports of robber bands multiplied, reaching a peak in the 1580s.
Furthermore, she observes:

The story of Christman Genipperteinga belongs therefore, in a literary and social context in which such reports were particularly frequent, relative to immediately preceding or succeeding periods, and should be interpreted with that in mind. For example, as Wiltenburg points out, the peak in report survival from the 1580s is partially explained by the 1588 death of report collector Johann Wick, whereas the historical context from other sources does not yield evidence for a comparable decline of crime in the 1590s relative to the 1580s. A contemporary witness who confirms the large increase in such reports was the preacher Leonhard Breitkopf. In a sermon from 1591, he wrote: Although Wiltenburg acknowledges that there may well have been an increase in crime in the latter quarter of the sixteenth century, she cautions a framing and delimiting of that increase, with respect to murders in particular, relative to the immediately preceding 16th century, rather than stretching it much further back in time. In particular, one cannot say, with any degree of certainty, that there were more homicides committed in the Early Modern Age than in Late Medieval times. For example, she states:

One important reason behind this discrepancy, apart from those connected with how new printing methods enabled more reports on crime to be published relative to earlier periods, is the new role of the Early Modern State in actively pursuing, publicizing and punishing crimes, rather than the passive role of the Medieval State, content with arbitration or mediation between aggrieved parties. If no one actively accused another person for a given injury/crime, then no crime existed in the eyes of the medieval authorities. This passive, accusation-dependent system of justice was gradually replaced with the more active, independently investigative and inquisitorial system of justice in the Early Modern period.

Comparing Genipperteinga's time with earlier times, Wiltenburg makes the following pertinent observation relative to the changes in the social composition of the archetypically presented lawless/violent men of previous eras to those from the latter quarter of the 16th century:

A particular urbanite concern in the High/Late Middle Ages were the depredations caused by lawless/feuding nobles:

The 16th century contrast to this earlier picture of "the lawless noble" is borne out by the following observations of Wiltenburg:

Thus, the report of Christman Genipperteinga appeared at a time when particular fears of the savage Outsider in the Wild were at their most acute, and when people generally regarded the Criminal as coming primarily from the idle, roaming poor, in contrast to previously primary concerns of haughty, predatory nobles, their brutal, willing henchmen and corrupt magistrates who chose to ignore the crimes committed by the former.

However, Wiltenburg cautions against a general, facile dismissal of sixteenth century tales of murder and mayhem (to which genre Genipperteinga's story belongs) as if they merely were to be considered as literary fictions or as pieces of state propaganda:

That being said, it cannot be denied that it was, at this time, a definite trend of sensationalism, and that some wholly untrue stories were produced and sold. In the words of the 19th century German historian Johannes Janssen:
Nor is it only modern historians like Janssen and Wiltenburg who display a measured, if not necessarily wholesale, skepticism towards the actual veracity of crime reports from this time. Already 40 years prior to Genipperteinga's supposed death, in his 1538 Chronica, the humanist and historian Sebastian Franck laments:

Later folklore 
Whatever actual truth value attaches to the account of Genipperteinga as related by Caspar Herber, the fact that the pamphlet was published in the same year as Genipperteinga is to have been executed, necessitates the view that Herber's account is among the earliest sources for the story about him in particular. Furthermore, within just a few years after the publication of the story in 1581, it was included as factual in calendars and annals, like those of Vincenz Sturm and Joachim von Wedel. Herber's account is, however, not the only telling of the tale that has circulated, and in this section a review will be given how the story has mutated throughout time, by noting deviations in them, relative to Herber's.
Christian Gnipperdinga
In Vincenz Sturm's (1587) continuation of Andreas Hondorff's "Calendarium Sanctorum et historiarum", in his entry for 17 June, the verdict of the murderer Christian Gnipperdinga is recorded as one of those significant events happening on that date. Some minor variant details occur relative to Herber, like the murderer's name, that "Burgkessel" was "zwo Meylen" distant from Cologne, that the booty was on 7000 Gulden (rather than 70.000), and that the maiden is said to be from Burgkessel, rather than from Boppard, and was on her way to Cologne, rather than to Trier when Gnipperdinga met her. Apart from that, Sturm's account is merely a condensation of the pamphlet, which he notes was printed in Mainz.
Christoff Grippertenius
Joachim von Wedel was a Pomeranian gentleman who wrote the annals of the most significant events in Pomerania of his time. He saw fit, however, to include sufficiently remarkable events from elsewhere. In his entry for 1581, a short notice of Christoff Grippertenius is included, with no geographical details given, but asserting that the six infants killed were in addition to the 964, an interpretation not forbidden by Herber's account, but not directly cited from it.
Christoff Gnippentennig
In his 1597 manuscript, Julius Sperber noted that Christoff Gnippentennig at Bergkesel murdered 964 people in addition to six of his own children.
Christmann Gropperunge, the cannibal
Johann Becherer, in his (1601) "Newe Thüringische Chronica", is an early source on cannibalism, stating that Christman Gropperunge von Kerpen ate the hearts of his infants. That feature is absent from Herber's account. Furthermore, "Frassberg" has become "Frossberg", and from the height above his lair, Christman is said to be able to view the roads to Saarbrücken, Zweybrück, Simmern, Creutzenach and Bacharach, in addition to those mentioned by Herber. Martin Zeiller, in his 1661 "Miscelllania" has Becherer as explicit source for his own brief notice, rather than Herber. In his 1695 account, von Ziegler und Kliphausen repeats Becherer's account, including the eating of the infants' hearts, lacking from Zeiller.
Christman Gnippertringa
In the 1606 continuation of Johannes Stumpf's "Schweytzer Chronick", it is noted that over a period of 30 years, a Christman Gnippertringa had killed a total of 964 people (no mention of cannibalism).
Christman Grepperunge
In this 1606 publication by Georg Nigrinus and Martin Richter, it is noted that the woman made the decision to betray Grepperunge, in revenge for her dead children, the moment she managed to get free of him (no cannibalism noted).
The arch-cannibal is born
In this 1707 publication, Christian Gnipperdinga (or Gropperunge) is, for the first time credited with eating his victims in general, not only his own children. It is said that over a great area, he had hidden away his lair with great rocks, so that nobody would ever think anyone could live in that rock desert. In the city, the girl is promised by the authorities to receive a pension for life, if she betrays Gnipperdinga. It is further stated that she brought back from Bergkessel a bottle of extremely strong wine, and Gnipperdinga falls asleep, as planned, from drinking that wine.
 "Murderers!", the cannibal screamed
Johann Joseph Pock, in his (1710) "Alvearium Curiosarum Scientiarum" furnishes basically a mixture of earlier accounts (including the eating of his infants' hearts), although he states that the young maiden wanted to visit friends in Trier, rather than her brothers. The most significant new element occurring in Pock is that with his dying breath, Christian Gnipperdinga screamed that he was murdered.
Christmann Gopperunge
In this publication from 1712 by Johann Gottfried Gregorii, averring as its source is Becherer (1601), a strangely merciful execution is meted out, namely beheading, rather than being broken on the wheel.
Christian Gropperunge
Referring to a recent French case of a highwayman found guilty of 28 murders, the author of the 1731 "Schau-Spiegel europäischer Thaten oder Europäische Merckwürdigkeiten" offers a batch of similar cases, including that of Christian Gropperunge (without any of the exotic details already circulating, just the numbers and general locations)
A filthy, stinking cave
In his 1734 "Seraphisch Buß- und Lob-anstimmendes Wald-Lerchlein", Klemens Harderer basically follows the 1707 account, interspersing it with digressions of cannibals in general, and the sin of drinking wine. Adding to his source document, he says the cave was stinking from human flesh, filled with human bones, and the girl (here called Amarina) is force-fed human flesh herself.
A nameless cannibal's cave
In an oblique reference in this 1736 publication, the details of year, location and numbers are getting rather hazy, and what is remembered is that the cave contained many weapons, along with human bones and skulls.
Dorothea Teichner and Gnippordinga
By the nineteenth century, more polished fairy tales had developed in the Rhineland area about the terrible murderer who once roamed there. One of those tales is about the pious maiden Dorothea Teichner, who is unlucky enough to meet the murderer Gnippordinga. Much conversation is added relative to the original in Herber. She cannot understand how she can be his wife, because there is no priest present. Gnippordinga merely laughs, and says the green woods are priest good enough. Years go by, and even more infant skeletons fill up the branches of an old tree. And Dorothea weeps every time when the wind moves them clattering about, while Gnippordinga taunts her and says: "What are you whining about? Our children are dancing and playing, so stop crying!" One day, when he comes back severely wounded, he sends her off to Burgkastel, to fetch medicine. She breaks down in front of a statue of Mother Mary, and bemoans all the horrors she has endured. She is insensible of the people gathering around her, so she didn't consciously break her vows to Gnippodinga. Once he is lying on the wheel, his bones all broken and dangling from it, his cries of pain when the wind moves them are met with the executioner's scornful words: "What are you whining about? Your bones are dancing and playing, so stop crying!"
Gniperdoliga, practitioner of the Black Arts
In none of the above given versions is there any mention of Genipperteinga making contracts with the devil, or having magical powers. However, the story of "Christman Gniperdoliga" is also the basis of a "Moritat", or "Murder ballad", typically performed at inns, fairs and markets. The ballad was printed in or shortly after 1581 within an anonymous collection of three ballads on Peter Niers, Christman Gniperdoliga and Simeon Fleischer, allegedly a reprint of a 1581 Basel print. The lyrics, as retold by Kirchschlager does include such points as well, in that Gniperdoliga's cave was originally made by dwarfs, and that he could make himself invisible by means of the Black Arts. In addition, the Moritat says Gniperdoliga was apprenticed under contemporary serial killer Peter Niers, having been his companion for two years. Finally, the Moritat says that the booty from Gniperdoliga's was divided between the hospital and the poor, his erstwhile "mistress" receiving a share as well.

Alternate tales
There are several alternate tales of Christman Genipperteinga, under alternate names, or have deviations from the original 1581 account.

Lippold and the Lippoldshöhle 
About 2 km southwest of Brunkensen, now in the town Alfeld in Lower Saxony, lies a cave that at least from the mid-17th century has gone by the name Lippoldshöhle. Writing in 1654, Martin Zeiller notes that there, "several hundred years ago", a robber named Lippold and his band had created their home, having made both a kitchen and stable there. Amongst other atrocities, they were rumoured to have kidnapped several young women, and strangled at birth the children they had with the women. Another version of the tale identifies Lippold as a Count Lippold of Wrisberg, who at one point assaulted a wedded couple, killed the man and kidnapped the bride, and kept her as a slave for several years. At one point, she was allowed to go to Alfeld, bemoaned her fate at a stone at the council house, and this led eventually to Lippold's downfall. According to yet another telling, the stone at the council house was originally red, but turned dark blue when she told the stone her harrowing tale. The stone is, reputedly, still there, and is depicted in the Alfeld's weapon shield. In this rendering, there was a hole in the roof of Lippold's cave, so that after he had fallen asleep in the maiden's lap while she was delousing him, the citizens let down a rope with a noose through the hole. The maiden fixed the noose around Lippold's neck, and he was strangled as the citizens pulled the rope up. Another version of his death is also given here, that the girl did not return at all, and that the citizens drowned Lippold by pouring water down the hole.

Apart from the connotation of the Lippoldshöhle as having been the den of a terrible murderer, some have pointed out that in the 13th and 14th century, the cave lay in the territory of the Rössing family of nobles, many of them having as their first name Lippold.

The robbers Danniel and Görtemicheel 
Wolfgang Menzel (1858) furnishes a number of other folktales similar in content to the pamphlet concerning Christman Genipperteinga in his chapter "Fairy tales concerning the long suffering maidens". The robber Danniel, whose brother was a smith and had helped him build his cave, was fond of abducting fair maidens. One of them had to live with him for seven years, but managed to flee, and was clever enough to distribute peas along the road, so that he was, eventually, caught. The robber Görtemicheel abducted a maiden, had seven children with her. She betrayed him on an errand to town, confessing her woes to a stone, and chose to mark the trail to the cave with peas. When returning, however, her tears suddenly flowed, and the robber understood that she betrayed him. As vengeance, he chose to decapitate their children, and hang the woman from a tree.

Schwarzer Friedrich, Henning and Klemens 
In 1661, the robber Schwarzer Friedrich (Frederick the Black) met his fate close to Liegnitz, now Legnica. The elements of the murdered children and the song are lacking, but yet again, a maiden is held captive, marks the way to the robber's cave by peas, and confess her woes to a stone.

The same basic scheme is found concerning the tales of robber Henning, whose reputed lair, the Henningshöhle, close by Treffurt in Thuringia which until the 1960s could be visited, but is now collapsed.

Close by the town Pritzwalk, the robber Klemens is to have had his lair and a captive maiden. She has also been extracted a vow never to betray him, but unbeknownst to her, when she bewails her fate to an oven, somebody who had hidden himself within it overheard her, and Klemens was caught.

The robber Vieting 
First attested in 1670 by Michael Cordesius, a robber called Vieting is to have lived in the cave Vietingshöhle, in the Sonnenberg forest near Parchim.

In order to alert himself whenever potential victims passed along the road through the forest, Vieting had devised a clever contraption with a thread, so that whenever anyone walked upon it, a small bell just outside his cave opening would ring. Then he could sneak up on the traveller and rob and murder them. One day, the bell rang once more, and Vieting brought his weapons with him, but when he saw the beautiful maiden Hanna walking along the road, singing to herself, he was smitten with desire, and chose, as Genipperteinga did, to order her to live with him as his mistress. Again, Vieting finally relented to let Hanna go to town to make some errands, after having sworn not to betray him. On her way back, she confessed her woes to a stone (and unbeknownst to her, several villagers listened in upon her), and in a distraught manner, some of the peas she had brought with her fell to the ground, thereby indicating for the villagers where they could find the murderer who had terrorized the region for so long. Vieting was caught and executed, and Hanna lived happily ever after, once again united with her family and friends.

Papedöne 
The robber Papedöne, who is to have lived in a cave called Papedöncken-Kuhl close to the village of Utecht near Ratzeburg is also said, like Görtemicheel, to have revenged himself on their common children when he understood he had been betrayed by his woman. He killed their two sons, hung them up in a tree, and as the bodies moved with the wind, he sang:

In a version from 1738, Papedöncke kills his children at birth, just like Genipperteinga, has their heads fixed along the rope as he sings his verse.

In another version of the Papedöne tale, he is said to have been active from 1314 to 1322. In this version, he used to hang the skulls of his murder victims from the branches of a tree, and used a rod to strike them to produce a melody, to which he sang the little song cited above. After having murdered six abducted maidens, he grew so fond of the seventh, that he couldn't bear killing her. Taking her once to the city of Lübeck, she recognized her brother in the crowd, but didn't speak out. Instead, she bought a bag of groats, and clandestinely marked the way back to Papedöne's lair, so that he eventually was caught.
A 1578 account concerning Papedöne
A work published in 1578, three years' prior to Genipperteinga's death, must hold particular interest. Here, the robber is fond of threading the skulls of his victims on a long rope, and banging them together, create the melody to which he liked to sing his ghastly rhyme. Here again, he kidnaps a young woman, who eventually betrays her secrets to a pier in a nearby church. The author of this work, Christoph Irenäus, says the story has previously been printed in the "Saxonian tongue".

Lastly, the following quotation from Ranke (1978), concerning the Papedöne stories, is somewhat noteworthy relative to explaining Genipperteinga's name: 

In one of these tales from Oldenburg, there is a whole robber band the poor maiden has to serve in their cave situated in the Damme Hills, she gets pregnant every year by them, but her babies are murdered at birth, and the robbers laugh and sing as the tiny bodies and skeletons sway in the wind:

See also 
 Sawney Bean, contemporary possibly fictional Scottish bandit and cannibal
 List of serial killers before 1900

References

Bibliography

Notes

1581 deaths
16th-century German people
Executed German people
Executed German serial killers
Filicides in Germany
German folklore
Male serial killers
People executed by breaking wheel
People from Kerpen
People whose existence is disputed
Place of birth missing
Place of death missing
Poisoners
Year of birth uncertain
Year of birth unknown